Ailie Jane Comer MacAdam  (born 6 October 1962) is a British engineer, a senior vice president of Bechtel Corporation. She was formerly commercial manager for a section of Crossrail.

Education
The eldest of her parents' four children, MacAdam was born in Edmonton, London, the daughter of Gilchrist G. MacAdam, a mechanical engineer. She studied GCE Advanced Levels in maths, physics and chemistry in sixth form. She was educated at the University of Bradford, where she was awarded a Master of Science degree in chemical engineering.

Career
MacAdam has worked in a senior capacity on several megaprojects during her career including CrossRail in London, High Speed 1, the Big Dig in Boston, the upgrade of St Pancras railway station into a Eurostar terminal (completed in 2007) and the Sydney Metro in Australia. From July 2014 until March 2015 she was managing director for global rail for Bechtel. In the UK's Network Rail only 5 out of 88 engineers are women.

Bechtel
She joined Bechtel on a graduate training programme in 1985, in its oil and gas division. She was a director of Bechtel Limited in the UK from June 2014 until April 2017.

Channel Tunnel Rail Link
From September 2003 to July 2008 she worked with Bechtel on the Channel Tunnel Rail Link, which became known as High Speed 1.

Crossrail
From April 2009 until July 2014 she was delivery director for the Central Section of Crossrail, with 21 km of twin-tube tunnel and six underground stations. This is Europe's largest engineering project. She was also the bid project manager for the Crossrail project. Bechtel built the central section of Crossrail where it formed one-half of Tube Lines.

Awards and honours
She was listed in the Top 50 Influential Women in Engineering in 2016 by the Women's Engineering Society. She works with STEMNET. She was elected a Fellow of the Institution of Civil Engineers (FICE) and interviewed by Jim Al-Khalili for The Life Scientific first broadcast in February 2018 on BBC Radio 4.

MacAdam was awarded an honorary degree, DEng (Doctor of Engineering honoris causa) from her alma mater The University of Bradford on 8 December 2022.

Personal life
Her godfather was a chemical engineer and her father was a mechanical engineer. She is married, and has a son and daughter. Both her children were born in Boston, USA.

References

1962 births
Living people
Alumni of the University of Bradford
Bechtel
British civil engineers
British women engineers
Crossrail
Fellows of the Institution of Civil Engineers
High Speed 1
21st-century women engineers